Vertex distance is the distance between the back surface of a corrective lens, i.e.  glasses (spectacles) or contact lenses, and the front of the cornea. Increasing or decreasing the vertex distance changes the optical properties of the system, by moving the focal point forward or backward, effectively changing the power of the lens relative to the eye. Since most refractions (the measurement that determines the power of a corrective lens) are performed at a vertex distance of 12–14 mm, the power of the correction may need to be modified from the initial prescription so that light reaches the patient's eye with the same effective power that it did through the phoropter or trial frame.

Vertex distance is important when converting between contact lens and glasses prescriptions and becomes significant if the glasses prescription is beyond ±4.00 diopters (often abbreviated D).

Derivation
The vertex distance formula calculates what power lens (F) is needed to focus light on the same location if the lens has been moved by a distance x. To focus light to the same image location:

where f is the corrected focal length for the new lens, f is the focal length of the original lens, and x is the distance that the lens was moved. The value for x can be positive or negative depending on the sign convention. Lens power in diopters is the mathematical inverse of focal length in meters.

Substituting for lens power arrives at

After simplifying the final equation is found:

Examples

Example 1: example prescription adjustment from glasses to contacts
A phoropter measurement of a patient reads −8.00D sphere and −5.25D cylinder with an axis of 85° for one eye (the notation for which is typically written as ). The phoropter measurement is made at a common vertex distance of 12mm from the eye. The equivalent prescription at the patient's cornea (say, for a contact lens) can be calculated as follows (this example assumes a negative cylinder sign convention):

Power 1 is the spherical value, and power 2 is the steeper power of the astigmatic axis:

The axis value does not change with vertex distance, so the equivalent prescription for a contact lens (vertex distance, 0mm) is −7.30D of sphere, −4.13D of cylinder with 85° of axis ( or about ).

Example 2: example prescription adjustment from contacts to glasses
A patient has −8D sphere contacts. What is the equivalent prescription for glasses?

Therefore −8D contacts correspond to −8.75D or −9D glasses.

Example 3: sample plots

The following plots show the difference in spherical power at a 0mm vertex distance (at the eye) and a 12mm vertex distance (standard eyeglasses distance). 0mm is used as the reference starting power and is one-to-one. The second plot shows the difference between the 0mm and 12mm vertex distance powers. Above around 4D of spherical power, the difference versus the corrected power becomes more than 0.25D and is clinically significant.

References

Geometrical optics
Corrective lenses